Commonwealth Avenue, formerly known as Don Mariano Marcos Avenue, is a  highway located in Quezon City, Philippines, which spans from six to eighteen lanes and is the widest in the Philippines. It is one of the major roads in Metro Manila and is designated as part of Radial Road 7 (R-7) of the older Manila arterial road system and National Route 170 (N170) of the Philippine highway network.

Commonwealth Avenue starts from Elliptical Road, which circumscribes the Quezon Memorial Circle, and it passes through the areas of Philcoa, Tandang Sora, Balara, Batasan Hills, Fairview, and ends at Quirino Highway in the Novaliches area.

The avenue, being located on Quezon City, which is listed as one of several cities in Metro Manila with high incidence of road accidents, has a high rate of accidents, especially related to overspeeding, and has gained the nickname "Killer Highway". A  speed limit is being enforced to reduce the high rate of accidents on the avenue.

Route description
Commonwealth Avenue follows a curving route from Elliptical Road to Quirino Highway, which includes the section named Fairview Avenue. The main segment, south of its roundabout intersection with Doña Carmen Street called Fairview Rotonda, is characterized by partial control of access, where at-grade intersections are replaced with interchanges and U-turn slots, and pedestrian crossings placed on overpasses (or footbridges). The segment has 18 lanes, with 9 lanes per direction, excluding lanes allocated for buses and jeepneys. Fairview Avenue, which refers to the avenue's segment north of Fairview Rotonda, has 6 to 8 lanes with 3 to 4 lanes per direction, but intersections are mostly at-grade, usually with traffic lights.

Being located in Quezon City, which has a high number of road accidents, Commonwealth Avenue has a high incidence of accidents along with Quezon Avenue. The number of accidents in the avenue have lend its known nickname, the "Killer Highway".

MRT Line 7
The Metro Rail Transit Line 7 (MRT 7), which will connect with the Metro Rail Transit Line 3 at North Triangle Common Station, began construction in 2016. Most of the alignment of the MRT 7 will follow the Center island of Commonwealth Avenue up to Regalado Highway.

History 

Commonwealth Avenue is divided into two portions, the six-to eight-lane Fairview Avenue and the eighteen-lane Don Mariano Marcos Avenue. Don Mariano Marcos Avenue, named after Mariano Marcos, the father of President Ferdinand Marcos, was constructed in the late-1960s as a two-lane highway to offer a route from Quezon Memorial Circle to the new National Government Center (location of the present-day Batasang Pambansa Complex) at Constitution Hill. Quezon City was then the capital of the Philippines and embassies were to be put up on the stretch of highway. Because the country's capital was moved back to Manila in 1976, other establishments were put up instead. Don Mariano Marcos Avenue was later renamed into two parts, Commonwealth Avenue and Quezon Avenue. Later, Commonwealth Avenue regained the eight-lane Fairview Avenue, which used to end near Jordan Plains Subdivision in Novaliches.

In the 1980s, the road was widened into a six-lane highway. During the late 1990s and early 2000s, the avenue was prone to heavy traffic and accidents due to the increase in number of public transportation vehicles plying the highway, and sidewalk vendors crowding onto the road. In the late 2000s, the Metropolitan Manila Development Authority (MMDA) cleared the sidewalk vendors, especially in the Tandang Sora area, which was prone to heavy rush hour traffic. Fairview Avenue uses stoplights and center island splittings at its intersections, while Don Mariano Marcos Avenue uses interchanges at its intersections.

The avenue is 18 lanes at its widest, and is the widest road in the Philippines, beating the old record set by EDSA.

Linking to Quirino Highway 
The project was completed in May 2011 and is already operational.

Speed limit implementation 
In May 2011, a  speed limit was implemented on Commonwealth Avenue following the death of Lourdes Estella-Simbulan, a journalist, in a road accident on the avenue.

Intersections

Notes

References

External links

Streets in Quezon City